The 1991 Canadian Soccer League season was the fifth season of play for the Canadian Soccer League, a Division 1 men's soccer league in the Canadian soccer pyramid.

Format and changes from previous season
Prior to the 1991 season, the league placed four franchises under suspension – Ottawa Intrepid, Edmonton Brick Men, Victoria Vistas, and London Lasers – due to financial difficulties. Ultimately, Ottawa, Edmonton, and Victoria folded, while London requested a one-year leave of absence. To avoid similar problems that the now defunct NASL had in its final year of operation, the league approved a $175,000 salary cap per team to further limit costs.

In addition, CSL commissioner Dale Barnes retired in January after directing the league since its inception, with Hamilton Steelers owner, Mario DiBartolomeo, taking over the responsibilities on a temporary basis. The league also approved a travel equalization plan that dramatically reduced costs for Vancouver, Winnipeg, and Nova Scotia.

The Nova Scotia Clippers joined the league as an expansion franchise. In addition, the Kitchener Spirit changed their name to the Kitchener Kickers following an ownership change.

The league shifted to a single eight-team division, after previously operating two East and West geographical divisions since its inception, resulting in team's playing a balanced schedule for the first time in league history, playing each other clubs four times, twice at home and twice on the road. The point system was also updated along with FIFA's change to 3–1–0 (win–draw–loss). With the shift to a single division, the league reverted to six teams qualifying for the playoffs, with the top two finishers during the season receiving a bye to the semi-finals. The playoff format remained the same as the previous year.

Summary
The regular season once again belonged to the Vancouver 86ers, who were only the second team to win 20 regular season games. In the playoffs, Vancouver won their fourth consecutive league title, defeating the Toronto Blizzard in the finals.

Regular season

Playoffs
The playoffs were conducted with a total points system. Teams earned two points for a win, one point for a draw, and zero points for a loss. The team with the most points following the two-game series advanced. If the teams were tied on points, they played a 30-minute mini-game for a bonus point, followed by a penalty shootout if the mini-game remained tied.

Quarterfinal  

Hamilton Steelers won the series in extra time, after the series was tied 2-2 on points.

North York Rockets won the series 4-0 on points.

Semifinal 

Vancouver 86ers won the series 3-1 on points.

Toronto Blizzard won the series in extra time, after the series was tied 2-2 on points.

Final

Statistics

Top scorers

Top goaltenders

Honours
The following awards and nominations were awarded for the 1991 season.

Awards

League All-Stars

Reserves

Front office

Player of the Month

Player of the Week

Average home attendances

References

External links
 Canadian Soccer League 1991 Media Guide and Statistics
 1991 CSL Stats

Canadian Soccer League
Canadian Soccer League (1987–1992) seasons